Technodon Live is a live album by Yellow Magic Orchestra. It was recorded on the band's second and last show at the Tokyo Dome in 1993, and is the only full music album of the band's Technodon era.  It is composed mostly of Technodon material (although this album lacks "Nostalgia", "Silence of Time", "O.K." and "Pocketful of Rainbows", Technodon was played live in its entirety) with a few songs from Yellow Magic Orchestra and Solid State Survivor performed in the Technodon style. During the live performance, special audio effects were performed by Goh Hotoda, who also mixed both Technodon & this album, and computer graphics created by Daisaburo Harada were projected on a screen on the back of the stage.

Track listing
All tracks arranged by YMO.

Personnel
Haruomi Hosono - Bass, Keyboards, Vocals
Ryuichi Sakamoto - Keyboards, Vocals
Yukihiro Takahashi - Drums, Percussion, Vocals
Goh Hotoda - Special Audio Effects

Sampled from the originals
William S. Burroughs - Voice on "Be a Superman" & "I Tre Merli"
Ruriko Kamiya - Voice on "Be a Superman"
William Gibson - Voice on "Floating Away"
Hirofumi Tokutake - Guitar on "Floating Away"
John C. Lilly - Voice on "Dolphinicity"
Tomoko Nunoi (née Ebe) - Sexy Voice (Vocals) on "La Femme Chinoise"

External links

Yellow Magic Orchestra albums
1993 live albums